"Mission to the Unknown" is the second serial of the third season of the British science fiction television series Doctor Who. Written by Terry Nation and directed by Derek Martinus, the single episode was broadcast on BBC1 on 9 October 1965. The only standalone regular episode of the show's original run, it serves as an introduction to the 12-part story The Daleks' Master Plan. It is notable for the complete absence of the regular cast and the TARDIS; it is the only serial in the show's history not to feature the Doctor at all, although William Hartnell was still credited on-screen. The story focuses on Space Security Agent Marc Cory (Edward de Souza) and his attempts to warn Earth of the Daleks' plan to take over the Solar System.

After the show's second production block was granted an additional episode, outgoing story editor Dennis Spooner commissioned Terry Nation to write an extra episode as a cutaway to set up The Daleks' Master Plan. Nation wrote the episode while considering a Dalek-focused spin-off; in doing so, he realised that such a story would need a hero, and used James Bond as inspiration for Marc Cory. "Mission to the Unknown" was produced by the same team as its predecessor, Galaxy 4, in a five-week period that concluded the show's second production block; the two serials were held back to open the third season. Mervyn Pinfield was originally assigned to direct the stories, but failing health prevented him from continuing, and he was replaced by new director Derek Martinus. Pre-filming took place at Ealing Studios in June 1965, while primary production took place at the Television Centre in August.

"Mission to the Unknown" received 8.3 million viewers, a drop from the previous serial. Contemporary and retrospective reviews were generally positive, with praise for the script and direction, though some viewers were confused that the following serial did not immediately continue the narrative. The videotapes of the episode were wiped by the BBC in July 1974, and it remains missing with no remaining footage. Usually alongside The Daleks' Master Plan, "Mission to the Unknown" received print and audiobook adaptations, with off-air recordings used to construct the latter. In 2019, director Andrew Ireland and students of the University of Central Lancashire recreated the episode in live-action, replicating the original production value of the 1960s; released on 9 October 2019, 54 years after the original broadcast, the recreation received positive reviews for its faithfulness to the original material.

Plot 
On the planet Kembel, Marc Cory (Edward de Souza) and Gordon Lowery (Jeremy Young) of UN Deep Space Force Group 1 attempt to repair their spaceship to reach their rendezvous when they are attacked by their crew member Jeff Garvey (Barry Jackson), who was in a violent state of mind upon waking up in the jungle. Cory shoots Garvey dead when he was about to fire at Lowery, pulling out a long thorn from behind his ear. Bringing Lowery into the spaceship for debriefing, Cory explains himself to be a Space Security agent assigned to investigate a possible Dalek base for universal invasion with the presence of a Varga plant confirming their presence. Outside, Garvey gradually mutates into a Varga. At the Daleks' base, Dalek Supreme is informed that the representatives from the seven planets will soon arrive while sending a Dalek platoon to destroy Cory and Lowery.

Cory stands guard against the slow-moving Varga plants while Lowery finishes building a rescue beacon. They notice a spaceship flying above them, Cory deducing the Daleks are planning something big. As Lowery was about to record a message, Cory notices something moving in the jungle, ducking behind some bushes. The Dalek platoon arrives and destroys their ship with Lowery accidentally stabbing his hand on a Varga thorn as he and Cory flee. In the Dalek base, the representatives from the seven galaxies have gathered in a conference room. Dalek Supreme assures representative Malpha (Robert Cartland) that the human intruders will be dealt with. Cory is forced to kill Lowery upon learning he became infected and records a message, only to be surrounded by the Daleks and exterminated before he could launch the beacon. Back at the Dalek base, the representatives all approve in forming an alliance with the Daleks' plan to take over the Solar System while chanting "Victory".

Production

Conception and writing 
In October 1964, BBC Head of Drama and Doctor Who co-creator Sydney Newman had granted producer Verity Lambert an additional episode in the show's second production block to compensate for the second season's Planet of Giants—the penultimate serial of the first production block—being cut from four episodes to three. As most stories were generally structured as four or six parts, this extra episode failed to fit the regular schedule. Outgoing story editor Dennis Spooner eventually commissioned Terry Nation—creator of the Daleks and the writer of the first season's The Daleks (1963–1964) and second season's The Dalek Invasion of Earth (1964) and The Chase (1965)—to co-write the third season's The Daleks' Master Plan (1965–1966), and it was decided that the extra episode would be used as a cutaway to set up the 12-part story. By April 1965, Donald Tosh was in the process of replacing Spooner as story editor. The episode's production code changed throughout production: "DC" around April and May 1965, "T/A" in July, and later "T Episode 5".

The episode was produced by the same team as its predecessor, Galaxy 4; the two serials were the final to be filmed in the show's second production block, but were held back to open its third season in September. Mervyn Pinfield—an experienced BBC figure who acted as the show's associate producer from its origins to January 1965—was originally assigned to direct both serials, but his failing health prevented him from continuing, and Lambert brought on new director Derek Martinus to direct the five episodes. Martinus had recently completed the BBC's internal directors' course, and had no previous experience leading a television production. Having only seen a few episodes of Doctor Who, Martinus reviewed some of the previous stories with Lambert; he found them disappointing, which shocked Lambert, but stated that he wanted to aim for higher standards. Though Lambert was credited for "Mission to the Unknown"—the final story for which she was credited—her role had essentially been replaced by John Wiles.

Nation was commissioned to write the episode—then known as "Dalek Cut-Away"—on 25 February 1965; he delivered the script by its due date of 14 May, having also been writing for The Saint at the time. He approached the episode as a technical problem, requiring a small cast and self-contained narrative. The success of the Daleks at this time—particularly due to their imminent American debut in the film Dr. Who and the Daleks (1965)—led Nation to consider the viability of a Dalek-focused spin-off; in writing "Mission to the Unknown", he realised that such a story would need a hero. Inspired by the recent release of the film Goldfinger (1964), he wrote Marc Cory as a "space-age Bond". The episode was originally set on the planet Varga, the home of the Varga plants, but this was renamed to Kemble (later respelled as Kembel) during script revisions for The Daleks' Master Plan. The episode's draft script was titled "Dalek Cutaway", while the rehearsal script received the name "Mission to the Unknown"; the names were alternated and combined in different internal documentation, and the final title has been the subject of much debate.

Casting and filming 
"Mission to the Unknown" was unique in that it does not feature any of the main cast or the TARDIS— the only serial in the show's history not to feature the Doctor at all—a decision made partly to save money on their fees. Despite not appearing in the episode, William Hartnell was still credited for portraying the Doctor, while Maureen O'Brien and Peter Purves received credits in Radio Times as Vicki and Steven Taylor, respectively, but not in the episode itself. Jeremy Young, who played Lowery, had previously starred as Kal in the first Doctor Who serial, An Unearthly Child. He acted in "Mission to the Unknown" while rehearsing for his role as Macduff for Macbeth at the Edinburgh Festival, and was excited to working with Hartnell again but disappointed when he discovered his absence. Robert Cartland, who played Malpha, had been recently hired by Martinus to provide the voice of the Rills in Galaxy 4. The Dalek voices—provided by regular actors David Graham and Peter Hawkins—were pre-recorded in Lime Grove Studios on 4 August 1965.

The episode was Richard Hunt's first on Doctor Who as set designer; he made the jungle design, while series veteran Raymond Cusick on the rocket and message launcher, made both from stock set elements and by Shawcraft Models. For the Daleks' conference room, Cusick was inspired by the Nuremberg rallies. The episode used stock music composed by Trevor Duncan. Pre-filming for "Mission to the Unknown" took place on 25 June 1965 at Ealing Studios; the scene in which Garvey mutates into a Varga plant was recorded on 35 mm film. Rehearsals for the episode began on 2 August 1965 at the Territorial Army Drill Hall on Uxbridge Road, and the episode was recorded in Studio TC4 of the Television Centre on 6 August. The final scene of Galaxy 4 was recorded alongside the episode to avoid both hiring Barry Jackson and erecting the set; the scene was later inserted into Galaxy 4 during editing. Four of the Dalek props from The Chase were used in the episode. Recording for "Mission to the Unknown" cost .

Reception

Broadcast and ratings 

The episode was broadcast on BBC1 on 9 October 1965. Viewership dropped from the preceding serial, while the Appreciation Index remained reasonable at 54. 16 mm film recordings were made available for international sale, but the episode was never sold overseas, and BBC Enterprises withdrew it in 1974. The Australian Broadcasting Corporation considered the recording, but it was rejected by the Film Censorship Board in September 1966 as it was considered to constitute "horror", particularly the masked aliens, Varga mutations, and dialogue about murder. The original 405-line tape was cleared for wiping in July 1969, and the episode was erased in July 1974. It remains missing; no known footage exists, though an off-air audio recording was made by fan David Butler.

Critical response 
Bill Edmund of Television Today described the episode as an "exciting start" to The Daleks' Master Plan. Several viewers were confused by the lack of Daleks in the following serial, and some felt that they had become less frightening; conversely, some felt that the episode's other monsters were too scary. In A Voyage Through 25 Years of Doctor Who (1988), Ian Levine praised the "array of creatures", particularly the design of Malpha. In The Discontinuity Guide (1995), Paul Cornell, Martin Day, and Keith Topping described the episode as "macho, with a sinister atmosphere". In The Television Companion (1998), David J. Howe and Stephen James Walker wrote that the presence of the lead actors was "hardly missed" due to Nation's script and Martinus's direction, praising the tense atmosphere and set designs.

Commercial releases 

The story was novelised as part of The Daleks' Master Plan Part I: Mission to the Unknown by John Peel with a cover by Alister Pearson, published in paperback by Target Books and W. H. Allen in September 1989. An unabridged reading of the book was published as Daleks: Mission to the Unknown by BBC Audiobooks in May 2010 as a five-disc set, read by Peter Purves and Jean Marsh with Dalek voices by Nicholas Briggs.

Audio from the episode featured on the first CD of the five-disc soundtrack The Daleks' Master Plan, released by BBC Worldwide in October 2001 with linking narration by Purves; the first CD was distributed with the magazine SFX to promote the full set. In April 2010, The Telegraph printed vouchers for readers to obtain the CD from WHSmith. A library edition of the audiobook was released by AudioGO in 2011, and Demon Music Group published it as a vinyl record in March 2019.

Recreation 
After writing and producing his doctorate thesis about a 1960s-style recreation of the 2006 Doctor Who episode "Tooth and Claw" at Bournemouth University in 2012, Andrew Ireland wrote a proposal to recreate "Mission to the Unknown" the following year and brought it to the University of Central Lancashire (UCLan), but did not follow up; he specifically chose the episode as it was a self-contained story without any of the main cast. In mid-2018, when asked for an interview about his thesis by Doctor Who Magazine, he revisited the idea. Now an academic and Pro-Vice Chancellor of Digital and Creative Industries at UCLan, he obtained permission for the recreation from the BBC and Terry Nation's estate, writing a passionate email to the latter, who was "very supportive". With a support team at UCLan, Ireland began researching the project around this time. Several teams at UCLan worked in different departments, including costume design, fashion, make-up, and music; an external subcontractor constructed some of the sets based on the production team's designs.

The recreation was created in about five days in February 2019, and the multi-camera shoot was done in three days from 20 to 23 February. It was filmed in colour and converted to black-and-white in editing; the on-set camera monitors also displayed the image in black-and-white. Ireland, who directed the recreation, used both the original camera script and a newly-formatted one. He edited the episode by placing it atop the original's audio for the sequences to closely match. Mandip Gill, a UCLan drama graduate who played Yasmin Khan in Doctor Who from 2018 to 2022, sent a video message of support to the cast and crew alongside Thirteenth Doctor actress Jodie Whittaker. Peter Purves and Edward de Souza visited the set, and the former used his social media platforms to publicise the production. Janette Rawstron, the recreation's lead make-up artist who taught Media Make-Up at the nearby Accrington and Rossendale College, considered Malpha the biggest challenge, as the heat of the lighting caused parts of the make-up to shift around. The fashion department spent several hours sewing nodules onto both sides of the Varga plant, even though only the front is seen in the episode. For the jungle set, Ireland borrowed a technique used in the 1982 Doctor Who serial Kinda, spreading foliage across the studio floor; these were required to be moved to the side for the Daleks to move. Foliage and pot plants were sourced from around the university and from productions like Coronation Street.

Nicholas Briggs portrayed the Daleks in the recreation, having returned to the country the day before production following the Gallifrey One convention in Los Angeles. Briggs and Ireland met in 2013, when the former visited Bournemouth University. Briggs felt that the Dalek voices in "Mission to the Unknown" and The Daleks' Master Plan sounded "a bit more like" actors Hawkins and Graham than the Daleks; he adjusted his ring modulator to avoid this, but attempted recreate the original voices as closely as possible. James Burgess operated the Daleks and, alongside his father Mike, provided a blue-and-silver Dalek for use. In the recreation, Marco Simioni played Marc Cory, Dan Gilligan played Lowery, Jacob Marrison played Garvey, and Paul Stenton played Malpha. Several issues interrupted filming throughout the week—such as a fire alarm from the use of a smoke machine, and a malfunction of Briggs's ring modulator and a camera—but filming ultimately finished about an hour ahead of schedule. The Dalek set was used in one scene in the original episode, and later returned for use throughout The Daleks' Master Plan; however, due to the set's complexity and infrequent usage, the recreation uses models instead, with full-size close-ups for shots of the Daleks. The model shots were filmed some weeks after main production.

The recreation premiered on the Doctor Who YouTube channel on 9 October 2019 at 5:50p.m., exactly 54 years after its original broadcast. A behind-the-scenes documentary about the recreation was also released, created by YouTuber Josh Snares. The Guardians Martin Belam described the recreation as "effective", praising the Varga plants and Dalek death effect, but noted that the source material itself was "a bit stilted, stagey and even slapstick at points", calling it "an interesting curiosity rather than a 'must see. Erik Amaya of Comicon.com similarly felt that the dated techniques "make the 25-minute story feel slower than it actually is" but that this was "the whole point of the project", lauding the accuracy of the recreation. The episode was awarded a Special Jury Prize at the Learning on Screen Awards in 2020.

Notes

References

Bibliography

External links 

1965 British television episodes
Fiction set in the 4th millennium
First Doctor serials
Dalek television stories
Doctor Who missing episodes
Television episodes written by Terry Nation